This is a list of investigational anxiolytics, or anxiolytics that are currently under development for clinical use but are not yet approved. Chemical/generic names are listed first, with developmental code names, synonyms, and brand names in parentheses.

Generalized anxiety disorder
 Agomelatine (AGO-178; Valdoxan) – melatonin MT1 and MT2 receptor agonist, 5-HT2C receptor antagonist
 Riluzole sublingual (BHV-0223) – undefined mechanism of action
 TGFK08AA – 5-HT1A receptor modulator
 TGW00AA (FKW00GA) – 5-HT1A receptor agonist, 5-HT2A receptor antagonist 
 Vilazodone (EMD-68843, SB-659746A; Viibryd) – 5-HT1A receptor partial agonist and serotonin reuptake inhibitor

Panic disorder
 Darigabat (PF-06372865) – GABAA receptor positive allosteric modulator 
 JNJ-61393215 – orexin OX1 receptor antagonist 
 NBTX-001 (Xenon) – NMDA receptor antagonist

Post-traumatic stress disorder
 7-Oxoprasterone (7-keto-DHEA; HBL-9001) – "immunomodulator" / undefined mechanism of action 
 Acamprosate (SNC-102) – undefined mechanism of action 
 BNC-210 (IW-2143) – " modulator" / undefined mechanism of action
 Brexpiprazole (Lu AF41156, OPC-34712; Rexulti) – atypical antipsychotic / 5-HT1A, D2 and D3 receptor partial agonist and 5-HT2A, 5-HT2B, 5-HT7, α1-adrenergic, α2-adrenergic, and H1 receptor antagonist 
 Iloperidone (HP-873, ILO-522; Fanapt, Fiapta, Zomaril) – atypical antipsychotic / 5-HT2A, 5-HT6, 5-HT7, D2, D3, D4, and α1-adrenergic receptor antagonist 
 MDMA (Midomafetamine, 3,4-methylenedioxymethamphetamine, "ecstasy") – serotonin–norepinephrine–dopamine releasing agent and 5-HT1 and 5-HT2 receptor agonist – specifically under development as an aid to psychotherapy for post-traumatic stress disorder 
 NBTX-001 (Xenon) – NMDA receptor antagonist 
 Pomaglumetad methionil (DB-103, LY-2140023) – mGluR2 and mGluR3 agonist 
 Tianeptine oxalate/naloxone (TNX-601) – atypical μ-opioid receptor agonist

Social anxiety disorder
 Fasedienol (Aloradine; PH94B; 4-androstadienol) – vomeropherine / neurosteroid
 JNJ-42165279 – FAAH inhibitor
 TGW00AA (FKW00GA) – 5-HT1A receptor agonist, 5-HT2A receptor antagonist 
 Vilazodone (EMD-68843, SB-659746A; Viibryd) – 5-HT1A receptor partial agonist and serotonin reuptake inhibitor

Others/unspecified
 AVN-101 – 5-HT6 receptor antagonist 
 BNC-210 (IW-2143) – "GABA modulator" / undefined mechanism of action / α7 subunit-containing nicotinic acetylcholine receptor antagonist
 Deuterated etifoxine (GRX-917) – translocator protein (TSPO) agonist and GABAA receptor positive allosteric modulator
 JNJ-42165279 – FAAH inhibitor
 JNJ-61393215 – orexin OX1 receptor antagonist 
 MP-20X – CB1 and 5-HT1A receptor modulator 
 SRX-246 – vasopressin V1A receptor antagonist

See also
 List of investigational drugs

References

External links
 AdisInsight – Springer
 2016 Medicines in Development for Mental Health - PhRMA

Anxiolytics
Anxiolytics, investigational
Experimental drugs